Björn Folke Rosengren (born 14 April 1942) is a Swedish politician and advisor to the Stenbeck family.  

Rosengren was born in Täby. He was active in the labour union and as a Social Democratic politician. He served as chairman of the Swedish Municipal Employee Union ("Vision", formerly SKTF) from 1976-1982, and on the Federation of Public Employee Unions TCO 1982–1994. He served as county governor in the Norrbotten County from 1995-1998, as minister of enterprise from 1998-2002, and as a member of the parliament in 2002.

Personal life
Rosengren resides at Arnöbergs country manor on Arnö in lake Mälaren. Rosengren has been controversial with his role as advisor to the Swedish Stenbeck family and very close ties with the Prime Minister Göran Persson.

In a famous controversial statement, in connection with the proposed Telenor-Telia fusion in 1999, he called Norway the last Soviet-state.

References

20th-century Swedish politicians
21st-century Swedish politicians
1942 births
County governors of Sweden
Living people
Members of the Riksdag 2002–2006
Members of the Riksdag from the Social Democrats
Swedish Ministers for Communications
Swedish Ministers for Infrastructure